The following is a list of rhododendron cultivars and species which have gained the Royal Horticultural Society's Award of Garden Merit. They are mostly hardy evergreen shrubs with abundant, brilliantly-coloured, trumpet-shaped flowers, often in large spherical trusses. The group known as azaleas are often (but not always) more compact with smaller flowers and leaves, and may be evergreen (subgenus Tsutsuji) or deciduous (subgenus Pentanthera). Most rhododendrons bloom for a short period in late spring (April to May in the temperate Northern Hemisphere). They are seen at their best in a woodland setting with light dappled shade, in humus-rich acid soil.

Maximum dimensions are shown in metres.

See also
List of Rhododendron species
Rhododendron

References

Rhododendron
Rhododendron